Almaz Askarov (born 16 March 1973) is a Kyrgyzstani wrestler. He competed in the men's freestyle 69 kg at the 2000 Summer Olympics.

References

External links
 

1973 births
Living people
Kyrgyzstani male sport wrestlers
Olympic wrestlers of Kyrgyzstan
Wrestlers at the 2000 Summer Olympics
Place of birth missing (living people)
Wrestlers at the 1998 Asian Games
Wrestlers at the 2002 Asian Games
Asian Games competitors for Kyrgyzstan